Gersom Klok (born 7 October 1990) is a Dutch footballer who plays as a right back for HHC Hardenberg.

Club career
Klok made his professional debut in the Eerste Divisie for SC Veendam in the 2006–07 season.

References

External links
 

Living people
1990 births
Footballers from Lelystad
Association football fullbacks
Dutch footballers
SC Veendam players
Eredivisie players
Eerste Divisie players
Tweede Divisie players
Go Ahead Eagles players
HHC Hardenberg players
FC Emmen players
Asser Christelijke Voetbalvereniging players